Get Lonely is the tenth studio album by the Mountain Goats, released on August 22, 2006 on 4AD. It peaked at #193 on the Billboard top 200 album chart.

Track listing

Personnel
John Darnielle - vocals, piano, acoustic guitar, electric guitar
Peter Hughes - bass, percussion, vibraphone
Franklin Bruno - piano, organ, horn arrangements, acoustic guitar, electric guitar
Corey Fogel - drums
Erik Friedlander - cello, string arrangements
Gene Baker - trumpet
Jen Baker - trombone
Scott Solter - percussion, vibraphone, "landscapes", production
Aaron Prellwitz - engineering
Timin Murray - engineering

References

External links

The Mountain Goats albums
2006 albums
4AD albums
Albums produced by Scott Solter